Hreiðar Bjarnason (born 29 May 1973) is a retired Icelandic football defender.

References

1973 births
Living people
Hreidar Bjarnason
Hreidar Bjarnason
Hreidar Bjarnason
Hreidar Bjarnason
Association football defenders
Hreidar Bjarnason